Raclette is a Swiss dish, also popular in the other Alpine countries, based on heating cheese and scraping off the melted part, then typically served with boiled potatoes. Raclette cheese is historically a dish originating from the canton of Valais in Switzerland. This cheese from Valais benefits from an AOP. Raclette cheese is also a Swiss-type cheese marketed specifically to be used for this dish.

Raclette is also served as street food, but often with bread instead of potatoes.

History

Dishes of melted cheese were mentioned in medieval texts from Swiss convents as early as 1291. Melted cheese was originally consumed by peasants in the mountainous Alpine regions of the cantons of Valais and Fribourg (Switzerland), and Savoie and Haute-Savoie (France). It was then known in the German-speaking part of Switzerland as Bratchäs or Bratkäse, "roasted cheese". Traditionally, cow herders carried cheese with them when they were moving cows to or from pastures up in the mountains. In the evening, the cheese would be placed next to a campfire for softening, then scraped onto bread. Melting raclette-type cheese in front of a fire is attested in Valais since 1574. Since 1875, the French term raclette is commonly used for this dish. At the 1909 Cantonal Exhibition of Sion, raclette was promoted as a national dish of Valais. Raclette eventually gained national (and international) popularity from the 1964 National Exhibition.

In Valais, raclette is typically served with potatoes, cornichons (fermented, pickled cucumbers), pickled onions, black tea, other warm beverages, or Fendant wine. A popular French option is to serve it with white wine, such as Savoy wine, but Riesling and pinot gris are also common. Traditionally, it is consumed with black tea, since a warm beverage is considered to improve digestion.

In Switzerland, a scraper continuously serves all in the restaurant from an oven placed in a separated table or near a wood fire. In France, restaurateurs often place a raclette oven directly on the table, in which case the scraping is to be done by the guests.

The name of the dish comes from the French verb racler, 'to scrape'. It refers to both the type of cheese and the dish it is served with.

Dish
Raclette is a dish native to parts of Switzerland. The raclette cheese round is heated, either in front of a fire or by a special machine, then scraped onto diners' plates. In at least one traditional Geneva restaurant the solid cheese is impaled on a spike next to the fire so that it drips. Warm plates with two or three slices of boiled new potato are held underneath to catch the drips and served immediately to patrons, whose bill is calculated by the number of servings they eat.

Traditionally the melting happens in front of an open fire, with the big piece of cheese facing the heat. One then regularly scrapes off the melting side. Some restaurants that serve raclette use a heat lamp to substitute for the open fire, with the cheese being put under the lamp as the customer orders and the melted cheese scraped off, as in the traditional method. The melted cheese is accompanied by small firm potatoes (Bintje, Charlotte or Raclette varieties), cornichons (gherkins), pickled onions, and dried meat, such as jambon cru/cuit, salami, and viande des Grisons, and to drink, kirsch, black or herbal tea or white wine from a Valais vineyard (a Fendant wine from the Chasselas grape).

A modern way of serving raclette involves an electric table-top grill with small pans, known as coupelles, in which slices of raclette cheese are melted. This new way has been used since the 1950s. Generally the grill is surmounted by a hot plate or griddle. In Switzerland the electrical raclette is called "raclonette". The device is put in the middle of the table. The cheese is brought to the table sliced, accompanied by platters of boiled or steamed potatoes, other vegetables, and charcuterie (various meats). These are then mixed with potatoes and topped with cheese in the small wedge-shaped coupelles that are placed under the grill to melt and brown the cheese. Alternatively, slices of cheese may be melted and simply poured over food on the plate. The emphasis in raclette dining is on relaxed and sociable eating and drinking, the meal often running to several hours. French and other European supermarkets generally stock both the grill apparatus and ready-sliced cheese and charcuterie selections, especially around Christmas. Restaurants also provide raclette evenings for parties or dinners.

"Vercouline" is a raclette in which Bleu du Vercors-Sassenage is used. In Franche-Comté, the Bleu de Gex (or "Bleu du Haut Jura") and Morbier, both PDO, are used as variants.

See also

Culinary Heritage of Switzerland
Fondue, a different Swiss dish based on cheese melted in a pot

References

Cheese dishes
Culinary Heritage of Switzerland
Swiss cuisine
Cuisine of Auvergne-Rhône-Alpes
French cuisine
Potato dishes
Table-cooked dishes
Street food
Valais